Raw, is the seventh studio album by American band Crack the Sky. Other than Jamie LaRitz playing lead guitar, however, all of the musical parts were played by John Palumbo. The next Crack the Sky album, 1989's From the Greenhouse, saw the return of a number of veteran CTS members, most importantly guitarist Rick Witkowski.

Track listing

Personnel
John Palumbo – guitar, bass guitar, vocals, drums, producer
Jamie LaRitz – lead guitar, EFX
David Heckscher – Elvis voice
Connell Byrne – cover

References

1986 albums
Crack the Sky albums